Texas Carnival is a 1951 American Technicolor musical film directed by Charles Walters and starring Esther Williams, Red Skelton and Howard Keel.

Plot
A dunk tank at a Texas carnival is operated by Debbie Telford and partner Cornie Quinell. An honest man, Cornie helps the inebriated Dan Sabinas, a millionaire rancher, who is being taken advantage of at another carny booth.

A grateful Dan is put in a taxi, with Cornie promising to return his car. Dan drunkenly has the cab take him to Mexico instead.

As Cornie and Debbie drive to Dan's hotel in his car, they end up being mistaken for Dan and wealthy sister Marilla. In time, Cornie comes to enjoy the lap of luxury and is attracted to lovely Sunshine Jackson, whose dad is the sheriff. Debbie is courted by Dan's handsome foreman, Slim Shelby, who pretends not to know she's an impostor.

In a poker game, Cornie is unaware that jellybeans being used for chips are worth big money. He loses $17,000 that he can't repay unless he can win a Texas chuck wagon race. Debbie's in hot water, too, because the real Marilla is suspicious of her.

Dan finally returns but can't recall who Cornie is. In an attempt to get Dan drunk again, Cornie gets tipsy instead and needs to drive his chuck wagon that way. But all ends well when he and Debbie end up with their new loves.

Cast
 Esther Williams as Debbie Telford
 Red Skelton as Cornie Quinell
 Howard Keel as Slim Shelby
 Ann Miller as Sunshine Jackson
 Paula Raymond as Marilla Sabinas
 Keenan Wynn as Dan Sabinas 
 Glenn Strange as Tex Hodgkins 
 Tom Tully as Sheriff Jackson

Production
The film was originally called The Carnival Story and was originally envisioned as a vehicle for Betty Hutton. Then it was announced in February 1950 as a vehicle for Williams and Skelton; it was their third movie together, after Bathing Beauty and Neptune's Daughter. Filming was pushed back because of Williams' pregnancy. In August Howard Keel and Ann Miller joined the cast.

The film was retitled Texas Carnival in November 1950.

In December 1950 MGM announced Charles Walters would direct. Filming started February 1951.

Prior to shooting, the Red Norvo Quintet, which backed Miller on the song "It's Dynamite," included Charles Mingus on bass. The group pre-recorded the number as normal, but when it was time to film the performance, the studio ordered Mingus replaced with a white bassist to prevent the number from being cut from prints circulating in the South, as was customary back then.

The final version ran a mere 77 minutes, making it one of the shortest of MGM's "A" musicals.

Reception
According to MGM records the film earned $2,366,000 in the US and Canada and $1,454,000 in other countries, resulting in a profit of $681,000.[1]

References

External links
 
 
 
 

1951 films
1951 musical films
American musical films
Circus films
Films directed by Charles Walters
Films scored by David Rose
Films set in Texas
Metro-Goldwyn-Mayer films
1950s English-language films
1950s American films